Kingdom of Surasena (or Sourasena) was an ancient Indian region corresponding to the present-day Braj region in Uttar Pradesh, with Mathura as its capital city. According to the Buddhist text Anguttara Nikaya, Surasena was one of the solasa (sixteen) Mahajanapadas (powerful realms) in the 6th century BCE. Also, it is mentioned in the Hindu epic poem, the Ramayana. The ancient Greek writers (e.g., Megasthenes) refer to the Sourasenoi and its cities, Methora and Cleisobra. Sourasenoi is one of the Indian tribes and it's a Greek word by megasthenes named as Shoorsaini in modern Era.

Etymology
The Etymology of the name  is uncertain.

Location
The Śūrasena state was located on the Yamunā river, and its capital was the city of Mathurā.

History
The Mahabharata and the Puranas refer to the rulers of the Mathura region as the Yadus or Yadavas, divided into a number of septs, which include the Vrishnis. The Buddhist texts refer to Avantiputta, the king of the Surasenas in the time of Maha Kachchana, one of the chief disciples of Gautama Buddha, who spread Buddhism in the Mathura region.

Its capital, Mathura, was situated on the bank of the river Yamuna, presently a sacred place for the Hindus. The ancient Greek writers mention another city, named Cleisobora, in this region.

Archaeological excavations at Mathura show the gradual growth of a village into an important city. The earliest period belonged to the Painted Grey Ware culture (1100-500 BCE), followed by the Northern Black Polished Ware culture (700-200 BCE). Mathura derived its importance as a center of trade due to its location where the northern trade route of the Gangetic Plain met with the routes to Malwa (central India) and the west coast.

Gallery

See also
 Yadava

References

Sources
.
.

External links

Mahajanapadas
Mahabharata
Yadava kingdoms
Rigvedic tribes
Indo-Aryan peoples
Iron Age countries in Asia
Iron Age cultures of South Asia
Ancient peoples
Locations in Hindu mythology
Regions of Haryana
Regions of Rajasthan
Regions of Uttar Pradesh